The Missouri River is the longest or second longest river in the United States, depending on the source.

The Missouri may also refer to:

, the name of several merchant ships
, the name of five U.S. Navy vessels

See also
Missouri (disambiguation)